Väo is a subdistrict in the district of Lasnamäe, Tallinn, the capital of Estonia. It has a population of 130. It is the easternmost subdistrict of Tallinn.

See also
Lake Tooma

References 

Subdistricts of Tallinn